Zhang Liuhong (born 16 January 1969) is a retired Chinese shot putter, best known for her bronze medal at the 1993 World Indoor Championships. Her personal best was 20.54 metres, achieved in June 1994 in Beijing.

Achievements

References

1969 births
Living people
Chinese female shot putters
Asian Games medalists in athletics (track and field)
Asian Games silver medalists for China
Medalists at the 1994 Asian Games
Athletes (track and field) at the 1994 Asian Games
20th-century Chinese women